Aurora is used as a charge in heraldry. The use of the aurora is often connected with a northern geographic position. The aurora is often made in silver or gold and is a band of floating bends.

The aurora is often called polar light or northern light. It is used in many arms in Russian Murmansk Oblast.

Examples

External links 

Heraldic charges